Chinocossus acronyctoides is a moth in the family Cossidae. It is found in Kashmir, India and Vietnam.

The larvae feed on Tamarix articulata.

References

Natural History Museum Lepidoptera generic names catalog

Cossinae
Moths described in 1879
Moths of Asia